Tynia Gaither (born 16 March 1993) is a Bahamian athlete competing in sprinting events. Gaither has represented the Bahamas at the 2016 and 2020 Summer Olympics.

Career 
She won the silver medal in the 200 metres at the 2010 Summer Youth Olympics. She later represented her country in the 60 metres at the 2016 World Indoor Championships without advancing from the first round. 

She competed at the 2019 Pan American Games, winning a bronze medal.

Competition record

1 Disqualified in the semifinals

Personal bests
Outdoor
100 metres – 11.02 (+1.3 m/s, Miami 2021)
200 metres – 22.41 (+2.0 m/s, Eugene 2022)
Indoor
60 metres – 7.23 (Seattle 2015)
200 metres – 23.11 (Fayetteville 2016)

External links

References

 

1993 births
Living people
Bahamian female sprinters
Athletes (track and field) at the 2010 Summer Youth Olympics
People from Freeport, Bahamas
Bahamian female hurdlers
Athletes (track and field) at the 2016 Summer Olympics
Olympic athletes of the Bahamas
Athletes (track and field) at the 2019 Pan American Games
Pan American Games bronze medalists for the Bahamas
Pan American Games medalists in athletics (track and field)
Medalists at the 2019 Pan American Games
Youth Olympic gold medalists in athletics (track and field)
Athletes (track and field) at the 2020 Summer Olympics
Athletes (track and field) at the 2022 Commonwealth Games